Markus Levonte Wheaton (born February 7, 1991) is a former American football wide receiver. He played college football for Oregon State University and was drafted by the Pittsburgh Steelers in the third round (79th overall) of the 2013 NFL Draft. He also played for the Chicago Bears and Philadelphia Eagles.

Early years
Wheaton was born in Phoenix, Arizona. He attended Mountain Pointe High School, and played for the Mountain Pointe Pride high school football team from 2005–2007. He had 23 receptions for 476 yards and six touchdowns as a junior, and added 49 tackles on defense. He also attended Chandler High School, and played for the Chandler Wolves high school football team. He recorded 736 yards receiving on 37 receptions with four touchdowns as a senior. He was a three-time first-team all-region and honorable mention all-state selection. Considered a three-star recruit by Rivals.com, he was rated the No. 41 athlete in the nation. He committed to Oregon State.

Wheaton was also a standout sprinter for the Chandler High School track team. He won both the 200-meter dash (21.42s) and 400-meter dash (47.38s) at the 2009 Chandler Invitationals. He also ran a season-best time of 10.81 seconds in the 100 meters at the 2009 5AI State Championships.

College career
While attending Oregon State University, Wheaton played for the Oregon State Beavers football team from 2009 to 2012.  As a senior in 2012, he was a first-team All-Pac-12 Conference selection. During his college career, he recorded 227 receptions for 2,994 yards and 16 touchdowns.

Wheaton was also on the Oregon State University track team. He ran a career-best time of 46.80 seconds in the 400 meters at the prelims of the 5A Fiesta Regional Championships. He finished 2nd in the 100 meters at the 2012 Oregon Twilight Meet, with a time of 10.58 seconds. He was also timed at 10.35 seconds in the 100 meters.

College statistics

Professional career

Pittsburgh Steelers
The Pittsburgh Steelers picked Wheaton in the third round, with the 79th overall pick, of the 2013 NFL Draft. He signed a 4-year contract for $2.81 million with $591,000 guaranteed.

2013 season
Wheaton made his NFL debut on September 8, 2013 against the Tennessee Titans. On September 29, 2013, Wheaton made his first career start and made 3 catches for 26 yards in a 34–27 loss to the Minnesota Vikings. During a Week 11 matchup with the Detroit Lions, he made a season-high 3 receptions for 38 yards. He finished his rookie season with 6 catches for 64 yards in 12 games and 1 start.

2014 season
During the 2014 offseason, the Pittsburgh Steelers lost veteran wide receiver Emmanuel Sanders to the Denver Broncos via free agency. With the loss of Sanders, Wheaton was given a larger role in the offense.

On September 7, 2014, he started the season opener against the Cleveland Browns and ended the game with a season-high 6 receptions and 97 yards. In Week 8, Wheaton made 5 catches for 56-yards and caught his first career touchdown in a 51–34 victory over the Indianapolis Colts. The next game, he caught 2 passes for 62 receiving yards and scored a 47-yard touchdown in a win over the Baltimore Ravens. He played in his first career postseason game on January 3, 2015, and made 5 receptions for 66-yards in a 17-30 loss to the Ravens. He finished his second season with 53 receptions, 644 receiving yards, and 2 touchdowns in 11 starts and 16 games.

2015 season
Wheaton began appearing more in the slot position as Martavis Bryant emerged last season. With Bryant becoming more solidified in the offense, Wheaton was poised to become a full-time receiver during 2015. Wheaton began the season starting against the New England Patriots and caught 3 passes for 55-yards in a 28–21 loss. On October 12, 2015, he caught a 72-yard touchdown pass from Michael Vick in a 24–20 victory at the San Diego Chargers. During a Week 12 loss at Seattle, Wheaton made a career-high 9 catches for 201-yards and scores on a 69-yard touchdown. On December 20, 2015, he continued to make progress as he made 6 receptions for 62-yards and a touchdown in a 34–27 victory over the Denver Broncos. Wheaton finished the regular season with 44 receptions for 749 yards and 5 touchdowns, and his 17.0 yards per reception was No. 10 among NFL wide receivers in 2015.

2016 season
Wheaton played in three games in the 2016 season with two starts recording four catches for 51 yards and a touchdown before suffering a shoulder injury. He was placed on injured reserve on November 19, 2016.

Chicago Bears
On March 10, 2017, Wheaton signed a two-year contract with the Chicago Bears.

On March 14, 2018, Wheaton was released by the Bears after recording only three receptions for 41 yards in 2017.

Philadelphia Eagles
On May 2, 2018, Wheaton signed a one-year contract with the Philadelphia Eagles. He was released by the team on September 12, 2018. He retired on January 22, 2019.

NFL career statistics

Regular season

Postseason

Personal life
Wheaton's cousin, Kenny Wheaton, played defensive back for the Dallas Cowboys.

References

External links
Official website
Oregon State Beavers bio

1991 births
Living people
American football wide receivers
Oregon State Beavers football players
Players of American football from Arizona
Sportspeople from Chandler, Arizona
Pittsburgh Steelers players
Chicago Bears players
Philadelphia Eagles players